The Baku–Novorossiysk pipeline (also known as the Northern Route Export Pipeline and Northern Early Oil Pipeline) is an  long oil pipeline, which runs from the Sangachal Terminal near Baku to the Novorossiysk terminal at the Black Sea coast in Russia. The Azerbaijani section of the pipeline is operated by the State Oil Company of Azerbaijan Republic (SOCAR) and the Russian section is operated by Transneft.

History
A contract on the transportation of Azeri oil via Russia to the Black Sea port of Novorossiysk was signed on 18 February 1996. The trilateral contract was concluded between the Azerbaijan International Operating Company, SOCAR and Transneft. The oil transportation through the pipeline started on 25 October 1997. 

On 6 December 2006, after dispute over natural gas supplies from Russia, Azerbaijan announced that it will stop the exports of Azeri oil through the Baku–Novorossiysk pipeline starting on 1 January 2007. Although SOCAR continued decreased oil supplies through the Baku-Novorossiysk Pipeline, the Azerbaijan International Operating Company stopped using the pipeline starting from 1 April 2007 and SOCAR became the new operator of the Azerbaijani section.
  SOCAR temporarily stopped oil supplies through the pipeline in February 2008 due to a pricing disagreement with Transneft. Later that year, the disagreement has been resolved and SOCAR resumed pumping oil on old agreement terms. In August 2008, the transport of oil along the Baku–Novorossiysk pipeline was radically increased due to sabotage in Turkey and the conflict in Georgia forcing a temporary shutdown of the rival Baku-Ceyhan and Baku-Supsa pipelines. As of 2013, the Baku–Novorossiysk pipeline remains operational, although the volume of oil pumped through it is relatively low. In 2012, SOCAR exported a total of 25 million tons of oil along all routes. Among them, only  2 million tons were exported through the Baku–Novorossiysk pipeline. The remaining 20 million and 3 million tons were exported through the Baku-Ceyhan and Baku-Supsa routes respectively. 
The crude oil transported through Baku–Novorossiysk pipeline is developed within the framework of Early Oil Project, first stage of larger Azeri-Chirag-Guneshli (ACG) project.

From March to July 2019, the pipeline closed down for maintenance. In October 2020, the pipeline was the target of armed attacks by Armenian forces. In January 2021, a deal was signed between SOCAR and Transneft to transport over 1 million tons of oil through the pipeline, but from January to February 15th, 2021, no oil passed through the pipeline (derouted via Turkey instead).

Route
In Russia the pipeline runs through Dagestan. Original route run also through Chechnya as it exploited the existing Grozny–Baku and Grozny–Novorossiysk pipelines. However, during the Second Chechen War the Chechen section of the pipeline was closed and Transneft built a Chechenya- bypass loop.

Technical features
The pipeline has three pump stations in Sangachal, Sumgait and Siyazan.

Volumes exported 

 2008: 1.3 million tons
 2009: 2.55 million tons
 2017: 1.49 million tons (+15% yoy)
 2018: 1.2 million tons
 2020: 613,000 tons
 2021: 1.7 million (+64,5% yoy)

See also

 Azeri-Chirag-Guneshli
 Baku–Tbilisi–Ceyhan pipeline
 Baku–Supsa Pipeline

References

External links
 Western Route Export Pipeline (BP website)

Energy infrastructure completed in 2006
Oil pipelines in Russia
Oil pipelines in Azerbaijan
Caspian Sea
Azerbaijan–Russia relations
Black Sea energy